STS-113 was a Space Shuttle mission to the International Space Station (ISS) flown by Space Shuttle Endeavour. During the 14-day mission in late 2002, Endeavour and its crew extended the ISS backbone with the P1 truss and exchanged the Expedition 5 and Expedition 6 crews aboard the station. With Commander Jim Wetherbee and Pilot Paul Lockhart at the controls, Endeavour docked with the station on 25 November 2002 to begin seven days of station assembly, spacewalks and crew and equipment transfers. This was the last flight of Endeavour before entering its Orbiter Major Modification period until STS-118 in 2007 which include modernizing the cockpit, and also the penultimate shuttle mission before the Columbia disaster.

Crew

Mission highlights

STS-113 was an Assembly Mission (11A) to the International Space Station, delivering the P1 Truss segment, which provides structural support for the Space Station radiators. Mission Specialists John Herrington and Michael López-Alegría performed three spacewalks to activate and outfit the P1. The STS-113 crew and both Expedition crews transferred about 1,969 kilograms (4,340 pounds) of cargo between the shuttle and station.

STS-113 delivered the Expedition 6 crew to the station for a four-month increment. The Expedition 5 crew returned to Earth aboard STS-113, ending a 185-day stay in space.

STS-113 came to a close when Endeavour glided in to a landing at Kennedy Space Center on 7 December. It was the 19th flight of Endeavour, the 112th shuttle mission, and the 16th shuttle mission to the station. The landing was the first (and only) time a mission ended on the fourth day of landing attempts.

Also carried aboard STS-113 was the Micro-Electromechanical System (MEMS) based Pico Satellite Inspector (MEPSI). This payload deployed two small satellites which are connected via a  tether.

STS-113 was the last successful mission before STS-107. Gus Loria was originally scheduled to fly as the pilot for this mission, but was replaced due to an injury. His replacement was Paul S. Lockhart. John Herrington, a member of the Chickasaw Nation, became the first enrolled member of a Native American tribe to fly in space.

STS-113 was the final mission during which Russian cosmonauts flew on the Space Shuttle.

Because Endeavour entered its Orbiter Major Modification period after the Columbia disaster, this was the last shuttle mission to fly with an analog-style cockpit.

Mission parameters

Docking with ISS
Docked: 25 November 2002, 21:59:00 UTC
Undocked: 2 December 2002, 20:50:00 UTC
Time Docked: 6 days, 22 h, 51 min, 00 s

Spacewalks

Gallery

See also

 List of human spaceflights
 List of International Space Station spacewalks
 List of Space Shuttle missions
 List of spacewalks and moonwalks 1965–1999
 Outline of space science

Notes

References

External links
 NASA mission summary 
 Status reports – Detailed NASA status reports for each day of the mission.
 STS-113 Video Highlights 

Space Shuttle missions
Spacecraft launched in 2002